Wimauma is an unincorporated census-designated place in Hillsborough County, Florida, United States. The population was 6,373 at the 2010 census, up from 4,246 at the 2000 census.

History
Wimauma was founded by Captain C.H. Davis in 1902. Davis named the town using the first few letters of the names of his daughters Will, Maude, and Mary. Wimauma was located on a  railroad route that was built south from Durant to Manatee County and into Sarasota, with construction starting in 1895. It was incorporated in 1902 as the United States & West Indies Railroad and Steamship Company. It became the Florida West Shore Railway on May 9, 1903 and then merged into the Seaboard Air Line Railroad in 1909. In 1902, Capt. Davis helped to build the railroad connecting Turkey Creek and Bradenton. He decided to found a town at the halfway point, opening a post office there on October 24, 1902. The town had the railroad tracks as the eastern boundary and was centered on Lake Tiger, now called Lake Wimauma. A railroad depot was constructed in 1903. The town was officially incorporated in 1925 as the county's fourth municipality, but the city government ceased to function some time in the 1930s. In 1993, this fact was rediscovered, but it was concluded that the incorporation was no longer valid after about 60 years without a city government. The railroad depot in Wimauma served as a passenger stop until 1968. The railroad tracks were removed in 1984, and the station had been razed years before this removal.

Geography
Wimauma is bordered to the north by Balm, to the west by Sun City Center, and to the south by Manatee County. U.S. Route 301 forms part of the western border of the community, leading north  to the Brandon–Tampa area and southwest  to Bradenton. Florida State Road 674 runs through the center of Wimauma, leading east  to Fort Lonesome and west through Sun City Center 9 miles to Ruskin.

Demographics

As of the census of 2000, there were 4,246 people, 951 households, and 820 families residing in the community. The racial makeup of the community was 51.13% White, 7.42% African American, 0.80% Native American, 0.21% Asian, 0.28% Pacific Islander, 37.21% from other races, and 2.94% from two or more races. Hispanic or Latino of any race were 72.89% of the population.

There were 951 households, out of which 53.5% had children under the age of 18 living with them, 59.2% were married couples living together, 17.8% had a female householder with no husband present, and 13.7% were non-families. 8.8% of all households were made up of individuals, and 4.1% had someone living alone who was 65 years of age or older. The average household size was 4.31 and the average family size was 4.36.

In the community the population was spread out, with 38.6% under the age of 18, 14.2% from 18 to 24, 27.9% from 25 to 44, 13.6% from 45 to 64, and 5.7% who were 65 years of age or older. The median age was 24 years. For every 100 females, there were 116.3 males. For every 100 females age 18 and over, there were 124.5 males.

The median income for a household in the community was $35,114, and the median income for a family was $34,671. Males had a median income of $20,484 versus $19,604 for females. The per capita income for the community was $8,597. About 26.5% of families and 31.7% of the population were below the poverty line, including 44.5% of those under age 18 and 11.1% of those age 65 or over.

Notable people

 Bill Warner, motorcycle racer

References

Census-designated places in Hillsborough County, Florida
Census-designated places in Florida
Former municipalities in Florida
1902 establishments in Florida
Populated places established in 1902
Populated places disestablished in 1993